Savage Sisters is a 1974 women in prison film made in the Philippines and directed by Eddie Romero.

It was the last and most expensive of several movies actor/producer John Ashley filmed in that country.

Plot
In a revolution-torn country, 1 million US dollars is stolen by a group of revolutionaries, including Mai Ling and Jo Turner. The revolutionaries are betrayed by gang members Malavasi and One Eye, who helped them with the job, and are imprisoned.

Policewoman Lynn Jackson busts Mai Ling and Jo out of prison. Captain Morales goes after them. The women deal with a con man, W.P. Billingsley.

Everyone chases after the money. Malavasi and One Eye try to get it, but are buried up to their necks in the sand. Billingsley tries to take the money, but is overpowered by the women.

Cast
 Gloria Hendry as Lynn Jackson
 Cheri Caffaro as Jo Turner
 Rosanna Oritz as Mei Ling
 John Ashley as W. P. Billingsley
 Sid Haig as Malavasi
 Eddie Garcia as Captain Morales
 Vic Díaz as "One-Eye"
 Rita Gomez as Matron Ortega
 Leopoldo Salcedo as General Balthazar
 Dindo Fernando as Ernesto
 Angelo Ventura as Punjab
 Romeo Rivera as Raul
 Alfonso Carvajal as Ruiz
 Robert Rivera as Rocco
 Subas Herrero as Victor

Production
The film's estimated budget was $250,000.

The film's star, Gloria Hendry, later recalled, "John Ashley was a lot of fun, a very positive individual with a lot of energy. A free spirit. It was the first time I had ever gone to Manila, to the Philippines, to work... I spent three wonderful months there. I learned a lot about the country and their process of doing films."

The film was originally called Ebony, Ivory and Jade and strongly featured martial arts. However, by the time the film was released, several martial arts films had not performed well, so the advertising campaign focused instead on the movie being about a Patty Hearst-type liberation army.

Reception
The Chicago Tribune said that "only the broadly comic performance of Sid Haig... breaks the monotony of it all."

The Los Angeles Times called it "one of the better lurid potboilers to come out of the Philippines... Romero's direction is snappy... amusing as a sort of very broad live action cartoon."

Diabolique magazine wrote that Ashley was "especially fun" in the film "as a mustachioed, cigar-smoking conman type figure, doing push ups in leopard print underwear and bedding the three leads, indicating Ashley might have enjoyed a decent career as a character actor in later years had he so chosen."

References

External links

Savage Sisters at Grindhouse Database
Review of film at Cinema Sentries
Review of film at New York Times

1974 films
Philippine drama films
Films directed by Eddie Romero
Women in prison films
Films shot in the Philippines
Films scored by Les Baxter
American International Pictures films
1970s English-language films